Andrew Dominik (born 7 October 1967) is an Australian film director and screenwriter. He has directed the crime film Chopper (2000), the Western drama film The Assassination of Jesse James by the Coward Robert Ford (2007), the neo-noir crime film Killing Them Softly (2012), and the biographical psychological drama Blonde (2022). He has also directed the documentary film One More Time with Feeling (2016) and two episodes of the Netflix series Mindhunter in 2019.

Early life and career
Born in Wellington, New Zealand, Andrew Dominik has lived in Australia since he was two years old. He graduated from Melbourne's Swinburne Film School in 1988.

Chopper
His career in films began in 2000 when he directed Chopper based on notorious Australian criminal Mark Brandon "Chopper" Read, starring Eric Bana and Simon Lyndon. Chopper received generally positive reviews, and Bana in particular was widely praised for his intense portrayal of Chopper. The Australian Film Institute awarded the film with Best Director (Dominik), Best Actor (Bana), and Best Supporting Actor (Lyndon).

The Assassination of Jesse James by the Coward Robert Ford
His next film was The Assassination of Jesse James by the Coward Robert Ford, starring Brad Pitt and Casey Affleck, based on the novel of the same name which he came across in a second-hand bookstore. The film explores the peculiar relationship between Jesse James and his eventual assassin Robert Ford. Pitt was a big fan of Dominik's first feature Chopper, and had hoped to collaborate with the filmmaker in the future, especially when Pitt had the chance to work with Chopper star Eric Bana in Troy. Pitt contacted the director, and with a big star interested to lead his new film, Dominik was therefore able to get Warner Bros. to finance the production.

Principal shooting in Canada was completed in 2005, though The Assassinations 2006 release was delayed to a fall 2007 release, largely due to studio interference with the film's editing process. Dominik and Pitt were pulling for a less quick-paced and more contemplative cut of the film while the studio wanted "less contemplation and more action". There were reportedly more than a dozen edited versions of the film at one time fighting to be the final cut, the longest version being over four hours. The disputes during post-production lasted for over a year before a final version was settled upon. Over an hour of scenes were deleted for the theatrical version, but Dominik remarked he was still very proud of the theatrical version of the film. The film garnered two Academy Award nominations: Best Cinematography (Deakins) and Best Supporting Actor (Affleck).

Killing Them Softly
Dominik reteamed with Brad Pitt in their second collaboration (after The Assassination of Jesse James) in a thriller/dark comedy based on George V. Higgins' Boston-set crime novel Cogan's Trade. The film was renamed Killing Them Softly. Shooting began in January 2011 and wrapped in May 2011. The film competed for the Palme d'Or at the 2012 Cannes Film Festival. and was released through the Weinstein Company.

One More Time with Feeling
In 2016, Dominik completed One More Time with Feeling, a documentary about his friend Nick Cave and the emotional consequences of the tragic death of Cave's son. The film premiered at the 2016 Venice Film Festival. The critical aggregator website Metacritic awarded the film a score of 91, indicating "universal acclaim".

Mindhunter
Dominik joined David Fincher for season 2 of Netflix series Mindhunter, which debuted in late 2019. Dominik directed two episodes.

Blonde
In 2022, Dominik completed Blonde, based on Joyce Carol Oates's fictional Marilyn Monroe memoir of the same name, which was scheduled to start shooting in January 2011 but the project was put on hold when he announced Killing Them Softly. In 2014 Jessica Chastain was in talks to play Monroe. In late 2019, Cuban actress Ana de Armas was cast in the lead role. Blonde had its world premiere at the 79th Venice Film Festival on 8 September 2022, and was released in the United States on 16 September 2022, before its streaming release on 28 September 2022, by Netflix. It is rated NC-17 for its graphic sexual content and is the first NC-17 film released through a streaming service.

Unrealized and upcoming projects
In 2003, Paramount Pictures approached Dominik and offered him to direct an adaptation of Alfred Bester's 1953 novel The Demolished Man, but as time passed, the project eventually became stuck in development hell when there were disagreements about the screenplay.

By 2003, Dominik had also written an adapted screenplay for The Killer Inside Me, an acclaimed noir novel by Jim Thompson, and was at one point considered to direct it, but dropped out. Michael Winterbottom eventually directed the 2010 film.

In 2007, Cormac McCarthy's Cities of the Plain was in development with James Franco starring.

In a 2008 interview, Dominik stated that he has interest in adapting Jim Thompson's Pop. 1280.

In 2010, Dominik was writing a script for an American remake of the 2006 French thriller Tell No One. It was unclear if he intended to direct the film.

In 2014, it was announced that Dominik would write a 3D remake of Shaolin Temple with Justin Lin set to direct.

In 2017, Netflix picked up War Party, a Navy SEAL adventure film written by Dominik and Harrison Query with Tom Hardy attached to star and Ridley Scott set to produce under Dominik's direction.

Influences
In the 2012 Sight & Sound poll of the greatest films of all time, Dominik chose Apocalypse Now, Badlands, Barry Lyndon, Blue Velvet, Marnie, Mulholland Drive, The Night of the Hunter, Raging Bull, Sunset Boulevard, and The Tenant as his top ten.

Personal life
Dominik has one son. He was engaged to actress Bella Heathcote in 2017.

FilmographyFilmDocumentary films One More Time with Feeling (2016)
 This Much I Know to Be True (2022)TelevisionMusic videos'
 "Down in Splendour" (1990) – Straightjacket Fits
 "Fall at Your Feet" (1991) – Crowded House
 "Cat Inna Can" (1993) – Straightjacket Fits

Awards

References

External links

1967 births
Australian film directors
Living people
New Zealand emigrants to Australia
People from Wellington City